The Kalba-Narym batholith or Kalba-Narym granitic batholith is group of plutons and intrusions in the northeastern half of Kazakhstan. The batholith formed in the Early Permian and is part of the Central Asian Orogenic Belt. It formed in connection to the collision of the ancient continents of Siberia and Kazakhstania in the Late Paleozoic. The fact that the batholith is coeval with the basalts of Tarim Basin in China may indicate they are both the result of magma formed by a mantle plume.

Common rock types found in the batholith are granite, granodiorite and leucogranite. The early intrusions of the batholith contain valuable ores as they include pegmatites rich in lithium, tantalum and niobium as well as veins with tin and tungsten minerals.

The Kalba-Narym batholith is made up of the following units:

References

Batholiths of Asia
Carboniferous Asia
Carboniferous magmatism
Devonian Asia
Devonian magmatism
Geology of Kazakhstan